The Meeting of Parliament Act 1797 (37. Geo. III, c. 127) is an Act of Parliament of the Parliament of Great Britain passed in 1797.

Section 1 originally established that Parliament could be summoned fourteen days after the issuing of a proclamation recalling it to meet, notwithstanding any prorogation or law that would have stopped Parliament meeting earlier than this. This was amended by the Parliament (Elections and Meeting) Act 1943 and now refers to any day after the date of the proclamation. The rest of the Act has been repealed.

Repealed sections
Section 3 enacted that in case of the demise of the monarch after one parliament had been dissolved, but before the day indicated by the writ of summons for electing a new parliament, then the previous parliament (i.e. that which had been dissolved) was to be recalled immediately to Westminster. It would there sit as a parliament for the next six months, to all intents and purposes as though it had not been previously dissolved; it could, however, be dissolved or prorogued at any point during this time by the new monarch. A new writ would be issued, and the election would take place. (This replaced the less detailed Succession to the Crown Act 1707, s. 6.)

Section 5 provided that if the monarch died after the date of the election, then the newly elected parliament would meet as normal.

See also
 Parliament Act 1911
 Prorogation Act 1867
 Representation of the People Act 1918
 Succession to the Crown Act 1707

References

Costin, W. C. and Watson, Steven J. (ed.). The Law & Working of the Constitution: Documents 1660-1914. A & C Black, 1952. Vol. II (1784-1914), p. 16.

External links

Great Britain Acts of Parliament 1797